Macbeth is a 2006 Australian adaptation of William Shakespeare's Macbeth. It was directed by Geoffrey Wright and features an ensemble cast led by Sam Worthington in the title role. Macbeth, filmed in Melbourne and Victoria, was released in Australia on 21 September 2006.

Wright and Hill wrote the script, which—although it uses a modern-day Melbourne gangster setting—largely maintains the language of the original play.

Macbeth was selected to screen at the Toronto International Film Festival in September 2006.

Plot
In a cemetery the Weird Sisters, three school girl witches, are destroying and defacing headstones and statues, while close by Lady Macbeth weeps beside a headstone marked "beloved son" and Macbeth stands by. The three witches plan to meet with Macbeth later, and leave the cemetery.

Macbeth leads Duncan's gang to a drug deal with Macdonwald and his men. In a gunfight between the gangs, all of Macdonwald's gang are killed. While chasing two gunmen, Banquo and Macbeth are led to the Cawdor Club. They seize the club and kill the owner.

Duncan hands the club over to Macbeth, and Macbeth and Banquo celebrate by drinking the club's alcohol and taking pills found on a table. During this drug trip Macbeth meets the three witches, who prophesy that he will soon be in Duncan's position with control over the gang. He tells his wife this, though she doubts he has it in him to take over Duncan's position. Later when she learns that Duncan will be dining and staying at their house, she plots with her husband to kill him.

Lady Macbeth drugs Duncan's bodyguards, and while they sleep Macbeth takes their knives and kills Duncan, framing the guards. Macduff comes to Inverness and finds Duncan murdered in his bed. Before the bodyguards can profess their innocence Macbeth shoots them. Malcolm, Duncan's son, immediately suspects Macbeth as having something to do with his father's death and flees.

After Macbeth is hailed as the new leader by most of Duncan's gang Macbeth sends two murderers to kill Banquo and his son, Fleance. The murderers kill Banquo, but Fleance escapes. Macbeth holds a celebratory dinner, and after learning that Banquo has been killed, sees a vision of Banquo's ghost at the dining table. Macbeth is becoming shaken by his desire for power. Lennox, Ross and others suspect Macbeth of killing Duncan and Banquo.

Macbeth finds the three witches in his house that evening and, after drinking a foul potion and engaging in an orgiastic sexual encounter with them, asks the witches of his future. He is told to fear Macduff, but no man "of woman born shall kill you". Later it is revealed that Macduff is not a natural birth, but a caesarean section, which is not "of woman born". He is also shown a vision of Fleance being hailed as gang leader. These prophecies enrage Macbeth, as does the witches' quick disappearance, and he has the murderers go to Macduff's home and brutally kill Lady Macduff and her son.

Lennox and Ross go to tell Macduff who has gone to his uncle Siward. Malcolm convinces him that Macbeth has gone much too far in his quest for power and must be stripped of his leader status.

Lady Macbeth has become more insane, re-imagining the evening of Duncan's killing and tries to wash off his blood from her hands. A doctor sedates her, and Macbeth appears indifferent to her instability. He prepares for the impending attack from Macduff, Lennox and Ross. Lady Macbeth commits suicide in a bath tub by slashing her wrists, enraging Macbeth. The two murderers, realising the unlikeliness of surviving the attack, swiftly flee Dunsinane leaving Macbeth with only Seyton, his main bodyguard, and two others. The murderers run into Macduff and his associates at the edge of Burnham Wood and are shot.

Malcolm leads his men to Dunsinane where they ambush the house and a gunfight ensues. Macbeth is chased to the cellar where he faces off with Macduff and is stabbed in the stomach. He stumbles upstairs to his bedroom, where the body of Lady Macbeth lies, and dies at her side. As Macduff leads Fleance, now the inherited gang leader, from the house Macbeth's "tomorrow and tomorrow and tomorrow" speech is heard.

Cast
 Sam Worthington as Macbeth
 Victoria Hill as Lady Macbeth
 Lachy Hulme as Macduff
 Gary Sweet as Duncan
 Steve Bastoni as Banquo
 Mick Molloy as Murderer in Brown
 Matt Doran as Malcolm
 Bob Franklin as Siward
 Hanna Griffiths as Angel
 Craig Stott as Fleance
 Terry Lim as the Chinese business man

Awards
 2006 Australian Film Institute Awards: Best Production Design (David McKay), Best Costume Design (Jane Johnston)

Nominations:
 2006 Australian Film Institute Awards: Best Cinematography (Will Gibson), Best Original Music Score (John Clifford White), Best Sound (Frank Lipson and John Wilkinson)

Box office
Macbeth grossed $232,994 at the box office in Australia.

See also
 Macbeth
 William Shakespeare
 Melbourne gangland killings
 Scotland, PA, another modern take on the play

References

External links
 
 
 Macbeth on Rotten Tomatoes
 Macbeth at the National Film and Sound Archive
 
 Macbeth Reference of Jesse Del Valle

2006 films
Australian drama films
2000s English-language films
Australian independent films
Films based on Macbeth
Modern adaptations of works by William Shakespeare
Films set in Melbourne
Gangster films
2006 drama films
2006 independent films